Amblyseius ankaratrae is a species of mite in the Phytoseiidae family. It was described by Blomners in 1976.

References

ankaratrae
Animals described in 1976